IEEE Transactions on Wireless Communications is a monthly peer-reviewed scientific journal published by the IEEE Communications Society. It covers all areas of wireless communication systems and networks. It was established in 2002 and the editor-in-chief is currently Junshan Zhang (Arizona State University). According to the Journal Citation Reports, the journal has a 2021 impact factor of 7.016.

References

External links

Transactions on Wireless Communications
Engineering journals
Bimonthly journals
Publications established in 2002
English-language journals